Hardcore TV may refer to:

 ECW Hardcore TV, a weekly professional wrestling television program.
 Hardcore TV, a 1992 HBO series.